Old Bloomfield is a historic home at Easton, Talbot County, Maryland, United States.  It is a large and sprawling structure constructed in three major sections: a -story, three bay brick section with a steeply pitched roof built about 1720; a -story frame addition on the southwest gable built about 1840; and a 2-story frame wing on the southwest end of this earlier addition.  Also on the property is a small frame dairy, a heavy timber-frame crib, and a barn.  It has remained in the same family as a working farm continuously since the 17th century.

Old Bloomfield was listed on the National Register of Historic Places in 1980.

References

External links
, including photo from 1980, at Maryland Historical Trust

Houses in Talbot County, Maryland
Houses on the National Register of Historic Places in Maryland
Houses completed in the 18th century
Historic American Buildings Survey in Maryland
National Register of Historic Places in Talbot County, Maryland